Jeremy Crowe (born 24 July 1985) is an Australian motorcycle racer.

Career statistics

Grand Prix motorcycle racing

By season

Races by year
(key)

Supersport World Championship

Races by year
(key)

External links
 Profile on MotoGP.com
 Profile on WorldSBK.com

Australian motorcycle racers
Living people
1985 births
125cc World Championship riders
Supersport World Championship riders